Malek Jaziri was the defending champion but chose not to defend his title.

Uladzimir Ignatik won the title after defeating Andrey Rublev 6–7(6–8), 6–3, 7–6(7–5) in the final.

Seeds

Draw

Finals

Top half

Bottom half

References
Main Draw
Qualifying Draw

Open de Rennes - Singles
Open de Rennes